Leilani Dowding (born 30 January 1980) is an English former Page 3 girl, glamour model, television celebrity, and the UK representative at Miss Universe 1998.

Early life
Dowding grew up in Bournemouth, and has a younger sister Melanie. They were brought up Roman Catholic by their Filipina mother Zena, and British father Chris.

Dowding and her sister attended St Peter's School in Bournemouth. She gained eleven GCSEs and three A-levels. She began an economics degree at Royal Holloway, University of London, in Surrey, with the intention of becoming a city trader. The then-18-year-old entered and won the 1998 Miss Great Britain competition. In  Hawaii later that year she became the first woman of Asian descent to represent Britain in the Miss Universe pageant.

Career
After her success in beauty pageants, Dowding dropped out of university to pursue a full-time modelling career. Although she had not originally considered topless modelling, she started appearing as a Page 3 girl in The Sun in 1999. Her younger sister Melanie ("Mel") Dowding also had a brief career as a model.

In 2003, she was rated #89 on the FHM Sexiest Women in The World list.

Dowding has been a guest on various television shows, modelling on the Big Breakfast and This Morning,  and appearing on Faking It, Celebrity Wrestling and Celebrity Fear Factor. She has also enjoyed a season in pantomime as Tiger Lilly in Peter Pan.

Dowding appeared on a charity Page 3 episode of The Weakest Link where she lost out in the final round to Jakki Degg. Dowding was competing on behalf of the RSPCA and breast cancer charities.

Dowding has competed in celebrity poker tournaments and done promotional work for Ladbrokes.

She also appeared in the American TV Reality Show Tough Love Miami, in which she dealt with her own superficiality in order to find a suitable mate.

She has visited Bosnia, Kosovo, Iraq and Cyprus on morale-boosting trips for British troops abroad.

She appeared in the December 2011 issue of Maxim U.S.

TV credits include: The Millionaire Matchmaker (Series 8 Episode 10) and Million Dollar Listing Los Angeles (Series 8 Episode 13).

Dowding has her own clothing line, the Leiluna Collection.

Personal life
Dowding has been engaged to former Wimbledon and Northern Ireland defender Mark Williams and was engaged to former Arsenal, West Ham and Middlesbrough attacker Jérémie Aliadière, having previously been in a relationship with former West Ham and Sheffield Wednesday footballer Anwar Uddin.

She was briefly married to restaurateur Richard Palmer, ex-husband of Raquel Welch, and is now divorced.

For the past two years she has been dating Billy Duffy, lead guitarist of The Cult. Leilani and Duffy got engaged in March 2020.

In 2022, Dowding made transphobic remarks about nineteen year old American beauty pageant contestant, Brían Nguyen, who became the first transgender woman to win a pageant through the Miss America organization, referring to her as a "overweight man caked in make up."

References

External links

1980 births
Alumni of Royal Holloway, University of London
English beauty pageant winners
English people of Filipino descent
English Roman Catholics
Association footballers' wives and girlfriends
Living people
Miss Universe 1998 contestants
Page 3 girls
People from Bournemouth